Isostyla purefacta is a moth of the family Notodontidae first described by Louis Beethoven Prout in 1918. It is found along the western slope of the Ecuadorian Andes.

References

Moths described in 1918
Notodontidae of South America